Denis Villeneuve  (born October 3, 1967) is a Canadian filmmaker. He is a four-time recipient of the Canadian Screen Award (formerly Genie Award) for Best Direction, winning for Maelström in 2001, Polytechnique in 2009, Incendies in 2010 and Enemy in 2013. The first three of these films also won the Canadian Screen Award for Best Motion Picture, while the latter was awarded the prize for best Canadian film of the year by the Toronto Film Critics Association.

Internationally, he is known for directing several critically acclaimed films, including the thrillers Prisoners (2013) and Sicario (2015), as well as the science fiction films Arrival (2016) and Blade Runner 2049 (2017). For his work on Arrival, he received an Academy Award nomination for Best Director. He was awarded the prize of Director of the Decade by the Hollywood Critics Association in December 2019. 

His latest film, Dune (2021), based on Frank Herbert's novel of the same name, premiered at the 78th Venice International Film Festival; the film received critical acclaim, was a commercial success at the box office internationally, and is his highest grossing film to date, and earned him Academy Award nominations for Best Adapted Screenplay and Best Picture, with the film itself winning a leading six Oscars at the 94th Academy Awards.

Early life
Villeneuve was born on October 3, 1967, in the village of Gentilly in Bécancour, Quebec, to Nicole Demers, a homemaker, and Jean Villeneuve, a notary. He is the eldest of four siblings. His younger brother, Martin, also became a filmmaker.

Villeneuve attended the Séminaire Saint-Joseph de Trois-Rivières and later studied science at the Cégep de Trois-Rivières. He studied cinema at the Université du Québec à Montréal.

Career
Villeneuve began his career making short films and won Radio-Canada's youth film competition, La Course Europe-Asie, in 1991.
Villeneuve cites Stanley Kubrick, Alfred Hitchcock, the Coen Brothers, Paul Thomas Anderson and Steven Spielberg as his main cinematic influences. 

August 32nd on Earth (1998), Villeneuve's feature film directorial debut, premiered in the Un Certain Regard section at the 1998 Cannes Film Festival. Alexis Martin won the Prix Jutra for Best Actor. The film was selected as the Canadian entry for the Best Foreign Language Film at the 71st Academy Awards, but was not nominated.

His second film, Maelström (2000), attracted further attention and screened at festivals worldwide, ultimately winning eight Jutra Awards and the award for Best Canadian Film from the Toronto International Film Festival. He followed that up with the controversial, but critically acclaimed black and white film Polytechnique (2009) about the shootings that occurred at the University of Montreal in 1989. The film premiered at the Cannes Film Festival and received numerous honours, including nine Genie Awards, becoming Villeneuve's first film to win the Genie (now known as a Canadian Screen Award) for Best Motion Picture.

Villeneuve's fourth film Incendies (2010) garnered critical acclaim when it premiered at the Venice and Toronto International Film Festivals in 2010. Incendies was subsequently chosen to represent Canada at the 83rd Academy Awards in the category of Best Foreign Language Film and was eventually nominated for the award, though it did not win. The film went on to win eight awards at the 31st Genie Awards, including Best Motion Picture, Best Direction, Best Actress (Lubna Azabal), Best Adapted Screenplay, Cinematography, Editing, Overall Sound, and Sound Editing. Incendies was chosen by The New York Times as one of the top 10 best films of that year.

In January 2011, he was selected by Variety as one of the top ten filmmakers to watch. Also in 2011, Villeneuve won the National Arts Centre Award.

Villeneuve followed Incendies with the crime thriller film Prisoners, starring Hugh Jackman and Jake Gyllenhaal. The film screened at festivals across the globe, won several awards, and was nominated for the Academy Award for Best Cinematography in 2014.

Following Incendies and Prisoners, Villeneuve won Best Director for his sixth film, the psychological thriller Enemy (2014), at the 2nd Canadian Screen Awards. The film was awarded the $100,000 cash prize for best Canadian film of the year by the Toronto Film Critics Association in 2015.

Later that year, Villeneuve directed the crime thriller film Sicario, scripted by Taylor Sheridan, and starring Emily Blunt, Benicio del Toro, Daniel Kaluuya, and Josh Brolin. The film competed for the Palme d'Or at the 2015 Cannes Film Festival, though it did not win. It screened at the Toronto International Film Festival in 2015 and went on to gross nearly $80 million worldwide.

Villeneuve subsequently directed his eighth film, Arrival (2016), based on the short story Story of Your Life by author Ted Chiang, from an adapted script by Eric Heisserer, with Amy Adams and Jeremy Renner starring. Principal photography began on June 7, 2015, in Montreal, and the film was released in 2016. Arrival grossed $203 million worldwide and received critical acclaim, specifically for Adams's performance, Villeneuve's direction, and the film's exploration of communicating with extraterrestrial intelligence. Arrival appeared on numerous critics' best films of the year lists, and was selected by the American Film Institute as one of ten films of the year. It received eight nominations at the 89th Academy Awards, including Best Picture, Best Director, and Best Adapted Screenplay, ultimately winning one award for Best Sound Editing. It was also awarded the Ray Bradbury Award for Outstanding Dramatic Presentation and the Hugo Award for Best Dramatic Presentation in 2017.

In February 2015, it was announced that Villeneuve would direct Blade Runner 2049, the sequel to Ridley Scott's Blade Runner (1982). Scott served as the film's executive producer on behalf of Warner Bros. It was released on October 6, 2017, to critical acclaim and middling box office returns. David Ehrlich of IndieWire wrote, "Few filmmakers of the 21st century have risen to prominence and prestige with the forcefulness of Blade Runner 2049 director Denis Villeneuve, whose seemingly unstoppable career has been bolstered by a steady balance of critical respect and commercial success. In fact, Christopher Nolan is the only other person who comes to mind, and the similarities between the two of them are hard to ignore."

In December 2016, it was announced Villeneuve would direct Dune, a new adaptation of the 1965 novel for Legendary Pictures with Villeneuve, Eric Roth, and Jon Spaihts writing the screenplay. Timothée Chalamet, Rebecca Ferguson, Oscar Isaac, Stellan Skarsgård, Jason Momoa and Zendaya starred in the film. The film was released on October 22, 2021, by Warner Bros. Pictures to critical acclaim and has become his highest-grossing film to date. A sequel, Dune: Part Two, was greenlit and scheduled for release on October 20, 2023. Additionally, Villeneuve will serve as an executive producer on Dune: The Sisterhood, a spin-off television series focusing on the female characters in the novel, for HBO Max.

Villeneuve is set to direct the adaptation of Jo Nesbø's crime novel The Son, which will star Jake Gyllenhaal and will be an HBO limited series. He is also attached to direct a historical drama about Cleopatra for Sony Pictures and an adaptation of Arthur C. Clarkes science fiction novel Rendezvous with Rama for Alcon Entertainment.

Personal life
Villeneuve is married to Tanya Lapointe, a journalist and filmmaker, and he has three children from a previous relationship. His daughter Salomé Villeneuve is also a filmmaker, whose debut short film III premiered at the 2022 Venice Film Festival.

Previously, Villeneuve had a relationship with Macha Grenon.

His younger brother, Martin Villeneuve, is also a filmmaker.

Filmography

Feature films

Short films

Television

Reception

Accolades

Honours

References

External links

 

1967 births
Best Director AACTA International Award winners
Best Director Genie and Canadian Screen Award winners
Best Director Jutra and Iris Award winners
Best Screenplay Genie and Canadian Screen Award winners
Directors of Genie and Canadian Screen Award winners for Best Live Action Short Drama
Canadian screenwriters in French
Film directors from Quebec
French-language film directors
French Quebecers
Hugo Award-winning writers
Knights of the National Order of Quebec
Living people
Nebula Award winners
Officers of the Order of Canada
People from Centre-du-Québec
Science fiction film directors
Members of the Royal Canadian Academy of Arts